Black Umbrella is the fourth album by the Kalamazoo-based progressive metal band Thought Industry, released in 1997.

Critical reception
AllMusic wrote that "a wide variety of sonic textures, complex rhythms, and an eclectic musical range, from heavy metal to alternative to jazz, support what is perhaps the band's strongest set of intricate, progressive melodies yet."

Track listing
All words by Brent
 My Famous Mistake (Oberlin) 2:50
 Blue (Oberlin) 2:30
 Tragic Juliet (Oberlin) 3:33
 World (Enzio) 3:53
 Bitter (Oberlin) 3:19
 Consistently Yours, Pluto (Oberlin) 3:16
 December 10 (Ledbetter, Oberlin) 3:52
 Edward Smith (Oberlin) 4:34
 Her Rusty Nail (Oberlin) 4:26
 Pink Dumbo (Oberlin) 3:10
 Swank (Oberlin) 3:14
 Earwig (Oberlin) 4:41
 24 Hours Ago I Could Breathe/Dec. 11 (Enzio, Bryant) 9:20

Credits
Paul Enzio - guitars
Jared Bryant - drums
Herb Ledbetter - bass guitar
Brent Oberlin - guitar
Produced by Mike Roche and Thought Industry

References

Thought Industry albums
1997 albums